Croc or CROC may refer to:

Arts, entertainment, and media

Gaming
 Croc (game designer), a French video game designer
 Croc: Legend of the Gobbos, a 3D platform video game
 Croc (2000 video game), a 2D sidescrolling port of the above game

Other uses in arts, entertainment, and media
 Croc (film), a 2007 movie
 Croc (magazine), a Canadian French-language humour magazine (1979–1994)
 Croc, a novel by David James
 Killer Croc, a comic book character

Brands and enterprises
 CROC, a Russian systems integrator
 Crocs, a shoe maker

Other uses
 Crocodile, a type of animal, in slang usage often called a "croc"
 Cardiff Roller Collective, a Welsh sports league
 Commandant Royal Observer Corps, a British military commander
 Confederación Revolucionaria de Obreros y Campesinos, a Mexican trade union
 Convention on the Rights of the Child, a United Nations treaty

See also
 Crock (disambiguation)
 Crocodile Tears (disambiguation)
 Croque
 Gator (disambiguation)
 KROC (disambiguation)